Ch'ien Mu or Qian Mu (30 July 1895 – 30 August 1990) was a Chinese historian, philosopher and writer. He is considered to be one of the greatest historians and philosophers of 20th-century China. Ch'ien, together with Lü Simian,  Chen Yinke and Chen Yuan, was known as the "Four Greatest Historians" of Modern China (現代四大史學家).

Life

Early life: Jiangsu, Beijing 
Ch'ien Mu was from the prestigious Qian (Ch'ien) family in Wuxi. His ancestor was said to be Qian Liu (852–932), founder of the Wuyue Kingdom (907–978) during the Five Dynasties and Ten Kingdoms period. He was born in Qifang Qiao Village (七房橋; "Seven Mansions Bridge Village"), in Wuxi, Jiangsu Province. His biographer Jerry Dennerlien described his childhood world as the "small peasant cosmos" of rituals, festivals, and beliefs held the family system together. He received little formal education, but gained his knowledge on Chinese history and culture through traditional family school education and continuous self-study.

He started his teaching career as a primary school teacher in his hometown when he was eighteen.

Recommended and invited by another famous historian Gu Jiegang, Ch'ien Mu was hired as a lecturer in Yenching University in 1930. He began his teaching career at several other universities like Tsinghua University and Peking University until 1937, when Peking was occupied by the Japanese army.

Hong Kong
Amidst communist victory in the civil war, Ch'ien arrived in Hong Kong at Chang Chi-yun's suggestion in 1949. With help from the Yale-China Association, along with Tang Chun-i, Tchang Pi-kai and other scholars, he cofounded New Asia College.  He served as the president of New Asia College from 1949 until 1965. This college has graduated many great scholars and outstanding members of various communities. After New Asia College became a member college of the Chinese University of Hong Kong and moved to Ma Liu Shui, Sha Tin, he resigned. Publicly he said that he wanted to devote more time to his scholarship, but in private he revealed that he felt that the college lost its freedom and might eventually disappear.   He then founded New Asia Middle School as a non-profit-making Chinese secondary school at the former campus of the college. He later received honorary doctorates from both Yale University and the University of Hong Kong.

He taught at the University of Malaya before returning to Hong Kong.

Taiwan

Ch'ien relocated to Taiwan in October 1967 after accepting an invitation from the President Chiang Kai-shek in response to the Hong Kong 1967 leftist riots.  In 1968, he was selected as a member of the Academia Sinica, which remedied a little his lifelong regret for not being able to be elected as a member of this Institute in the first election in 1948.

He was given land in Waishuangxi in the Shilin District to build his home Sushulou (素書樓) while continuing as a freelance academic researching and giving lectures at universities in Taiwan.

Ch'ien retired from teaching in 1984. After becoming one of the three constituent colleges of the Chinese University of Hong Kong, in 1978 New Asia College inaugurated the Ch'ien Mu Lectures in his honor.

On June 1, 1990, two Democratic Progressive Party politicians, Chen Shui-bian and Chou Po-lun, accused Ch'ien of occupying public land as the nature of gifting the land for Sushulou by Chiang Kai-shek to a private citizen was deemed to be illegal. Ch'ien and his wife moved out of Sushulou and relocated to a high-rise apartment in downtown Taipei City.

Ch'ien died on August 30, 1990, a little less than three months after being forced to move out of Sushulou.  Many of Ch'ien's supporters condemned the practice Chen and Chou of using Ch'ien for scoring political points against the Kuomintang.  Both Chen and Chou have since apologized for the damages of their accusations towards Ch'ien, and Sushulou is now the location of the Ch'ien Mu Memorial.

Works
Ch'ien wrote extensively on Chinese classics, history and Confucian thought. Unlike many 20th-century Chinese intellectuals influenced by the New Culture Movement of the 1910s who were fundamentally skeptical of traditional Chinese thought and Confucianism, he insisted on the importance of traditional values of Chinese culture. By the time of his death in 1990, his objections to the rejection of tradition of Confucianism had gained wider credence, partly through the influence of his student at New Asia College, Yu Ying-shih.

Ch'ien Mu was an extremely industrious and prolific scholar who had about 76 works published during his life, which exceeded 17 000 000 words in total. After his death, his complete works were collected and edited into 54 volumes, published in 1994 by Linking Publishing Company in Taipei. In 2011, a revised edition of his complete works was published in Beijing by Jiuzhou Publishing Company in traditional Chinese characters.

Representative works:
 A General History of China (Guoshi dagang 國史大綱);
 Comments on the chin wen/ku wen (New Text/Old Text) Controversy in Han (Lianghan jingxue jin gu wen pingyi 兩漢經學今古文評議)
 A New Biography of Zhu Xi's Academic Life (Zhuzi xin xue'an 朱子新學案)
 A Scholastic History of China in Late 300 Years (Zhongguo jin sanbai nian xueshu shi 中國近三百年學術史)
 History of the Qin and Han Dynasty (Qin Han shi 秦漢史)
 Neo-Confucianism during Song and Ming Dynasty (Song Ming Lixue 宋明理學)
 Examining Chinese People and Culture Through Chinese History (Cong Zhongguo lishi lai kan Zhongguo minzu xing ji Zhongguo wenhua 從中國歷史來看中國民族性及中國文化)

Criticism

Critics of Ch'ien's ideas, such as Li Ao, tend to focus on his superficial knowledge of non-Chinese currents of thoughts when he wrote his treatises on cultural studies, and his lack of objective, scientific method-based, defense of traditional Chinese culture.  condemns Ch'ien's own bias as "19th century traditionalist" in his "A Comment on Ch'ien Mu's Treatise on Chinese Scholarships During the Qing Dynasty" (錢穆論清學史述評) for being unable to view 19th century currents of thoughts with contemporary (20th century) perspectives.  It could be argued, however, the opposition is based upon the critics' support of the New Culture Movement's legacies, which Ch'ien explicitly rejected.

Another recurring theme from Ch'ien's critics, from the 1930s onwards, concerns his defense of traditional Chinese political system, headed by a monarch but with the government filled by examinations-based mandarins, as a representative form of government, as a simplistic fantasy.

Ch'ien Mu was also criticized for having invested in too many different academic fields. For example, his research on Chinese Literature was considered as "unprofessional". His work on Daoism and Zhuangzi : Zhuangzi Zuan Jian 莊子纂箋 had also drawn him criticisms for long.

Memorial
New Asia College Ch'ien Mu Library
Former Residence of Ch'ien Mu in Hongshan 鴻山 of Wuxi (Jiangsu Province)

Notes

References and further reading
 Jerry Dennerline, Qian Mu and the World of Seven Mansions (New Haven: Yale University Press,  1988).
 Yu Yingshi, You ji feng chui shuishang lin--jing dao Qian Binsi shi 犹记风吹水上粼－敬悼钱宾四师, collected in Xiandai xueshu yu xueren 现代学术与学人 (Guilin: Guangxi Normal University Press, 2006).
 Yan Gengwang 严耕望, Qian Mu Binsi xiansheng yu wo 钱穆宾四先生与我, collected in Zhi shi san shu 治史三书 (Shanghai: People's Publishing House, 2011).

External links

Chienmu's House in Shilin
Ch'ien Mu Memorial

Portrait 
    Qian Mu. A Portrait by Kong Kai Ming at Portrait Gallery of Chinese Writers (Hong Kong Baptist University Library).

1895 births
1990 deaths
20th-century Chinese historians
Chinese Civil War refugees
Chinese Confucianists
Academic staff of the Chinese University of Hong Kong
Historians from Jiangsu
New Asia College
Members of Academia Sinica
Academic staff of the National Southwestern Associated University
Academic staff of Peking University
Philosophers from Jiangsu
Philosophers from Zhejiang
Republic of China historians
Republic of China philosophers
Senior Advisors to President Chiang Kai-shek
Taiwanese people from Jiangsu
Academic staff of Tsinghua University
Writers from Wuxi
Academic staff of Yenching University
Educators from Wuxi